Dorcadion dimidiatum is a species of beetle in the family Cerambycidae. It was described by Victor Motschulsky in 1838. It is found in Iran, Turkey and Armenia.

Subspecies
 Dorcadion dimidiatum dimidiatum Motschulsky, 1838
 Dorcadion dimidiatum kelkiticum Özdikmen & Hasbenli, 2004
 Dorcadion dimidiatum korgei Breuning, 1966

References

dimidiatum
Beetles described in 1838